The Marmaris Dam is a concrete-face rock-fill dam on the Kocaalan Creek located  north of Marmaris in Muğla Province, Turkey. Constructed between 1998 and 2005, the development was backed by the Turkish State Hydraulic Works as a build-operate-transfer project.

See also
List of dams and reservoirs in Turkey

References

Dams in Muğla Province
Concrete-face rock-fill dams
Dams completed in 2005
Marmaris District